Wildlife forensic science is forensic science applied to legal issues involving wildlife. They also deal with conservation and identification of rare species and is a useful tool for non-invasive studies to determine relatedness of the animals in the area allowing them to determine rare and endangered species that are candidates for genetic rescue using things such as the SSCP or Single-Strand Conformational Polymorphism gel electrophoresis technique, microscopy, and some DNA and Isotope analysis they can identify species and individual animals in most cases if they have already been captured .

Techniques

Single-Strand Conformational Polymorphism Gel electrophoresis 
A simple and sensitive technique used to identify any mutations and also used in the genotyping of animals. The technique uses the method based on the fact that single-stranded DNA has a defined conformation. Any altered conformation due to a single base change in the sequence can cause single-stranded DNA to migrate differently under nondenaturing electrophoresis conditions, so a wild-type and mutant DNA samples display different band patterns.

There are 4 steps to this method:

 polymerase chain reaction (PCR) amplification of DNA sequence of interest
 denaturation of double-stranded PCR products
 cooling of the denatured DNA (single-stranded) to maximize self-annealing
 detection of mobility difference of the single-stranded DNAs by electrophoresis under non-denaturing conditions.

DNA and Isotope analysis 
DNA analysis is used to help determine the species of an animal they use DNA nucleotide sequencing as a key method and follow it up by comparing sequenced DNA fragments with reference DNA sequences of different species. The similarity or sequence homology between the unknown and reference sequences facilitates to ascertain the species of origin. This technique is used to determine relatedness of a rare species and to also check for any signs of inbreeding depression in the target species to see if it is a candidate for genetic rescue. Isotope analysis is used in this same vein to determine the composition of the habitat that animal resides in.

Microscopy 
This technique is when genetic microscopes are used to look down to a single cell it is used to look at recombination also look for mutations in genes it has been used to help identify many deleterious alleles in genes.

Laboratories and organizations

With the initiative of the Society for Wildlife Forensic Science (SWFS), the Scientific Working Group for Wildlife Forensic Sciences (SWGWILD) was formed in 2011. Also, the Wildlife Forensic and Conservation Genetics (WFCG) Cell was formed by merging the Wildlife Forensic and Conservation Genetics Laboratories for strengthening the enforcement of the Wildlife (Protection) Act, 1972 of India.

Scope

While animals and plants are the victims in the crimes of illegal wildlife trade and animal abuse, society also pays a heavy price when those crimes are used to fund illegal drugs, weapons and terrorism. Links between human trafficking, public corruption and illegal fishing have also been reported. The continued development and integration of wildlife forensic science as a field will be critical for successful management of the many significant social and conservation issues related to the illegal wildlife trade and wildlife law enforcement.

See also
Marine forensics

References

Espinoza, Edgard O., and Mary-Jacque Mann. 2000. Identification Guide for Ivory and Ivory Substitutes, 3rd edition. Ivory Identification Incorporated, Richmond, VA

Further reading

External links
INTERPOL Wildlife Crime Working Group
National Fish and Wildlife Forensics Laboratory
NOAA Marine Forensics Laboratory
Society for Wildlife Forensic Science (SWFS)
Article on SWGWILD (the Scientific Working Group for Wildlife Forensics)
Italian National Reference Centre for Veterinary Forensic Medicine (CeMedForVet)

Wildlife